Patrick (Pat) "Simms" Simmons (born November 21, 1974 in Moose Jaw, Saskatchewan) is a Canadian curler. Simmons played on the 2014 and 2015 Canadian champion rink, the latter year as skip. As a skip, he has also represented Saskatchewan in four straight Briers from 2005 to 2008 and again in 2011. He has also represented Alberta twice at the Brier.

He currently coaches the Robyn Silvernagle rink.

Career
Simmons made it to his first Brier in 2005 after winning his first provincial championship, defeating Daryl Williamson in that year's Saskatchewan final with teammates Jeff Sharp, Chris Haichert and Ben Hebert. At the Brier, he skipped Saskatchewan to a 6–5 finish, in a four-way tie for fifth place, out of the playoffs.

Simmons was the Saskatchewan provincial championship for the second time in a row in 2006, defeating Bruce Korte in the final. At the 2006 Tim Hortons Brier, Simmons skipped Saskatchewan to a 5–6 finish at the Brier, tied for eighth place and out of the playoffs.

Simmons won his third straight provincial title in 2007, defeating Eugene Hritzuk in the provincial final with new teammates Gerry Adam and Steve Laycock playing front end. Simmons had a much better record at the 2007 Tim Hortons Brier, finishing 7–4, but narrowly missed the playoffs once again, finishing in fifth place.

Simmons won his fourth straight provincial title in 2008, defeating Darrell McKee in the Saskatchewan final.  At the 2008 Tim Hortons Brier, Simmons finally skipped Saskatchewan to a playoff spot at the Brier, finishing the round robin in second place with a 9–2 record. However, he lost in the semifinal in an extra end to Ontario, skipped by Glenn Howard.

Simmons' rink qualified for the 2009 Canadian Olympic Curling Trials, but finished the round robin with a 2–5 record, in seventh place.

Simmons would return to the Brier in 2011, throwing fourth stones for Steve Laycock. The team finished with a 4–7 record.

The next season, Simmons joined the Kevin Koe rink out of Calgary, Alberta replacing Blake MacDonald. The team represented Alberta in the 2012 Brier, where they finished second. They played in the 2013 Canadian Olympic Curling Trials, going 2–5. The team made won another provincial championship in 2014. At the 2014 Brier the Koe rink defeated John Morris' B.C. rink 10–5 in the final, giving Simmons his first Brier title. The team finished fourth at the 2014 World Men's Curling Championship. It was the first time Simmons represented Canada internationally.

Koe left the team in 2014; the rest of the rink decided to stick together to compete as Team Canada at the 2015 Tim Hortons Brier, drafting John Morris to replace Koe as skip.

During the 2015 Brier after Morris's Team Canada started off 2–3 Morris approached Simmons with an idea that Simmons skip and Morris move to vice. The move paid off as the rink went on to win the competition. They finished in third place (bronze medal) at the 2015 world championships in Halifax.

Personal life
Simmons is a chiropractor by trade, but currently works as the Director of High Performance for Curlsask. He is formerly married to Cindy Simmons, and has two children. He resides in Moose Jaw.

Teams

Grand Slam record

References

External links

 Team Koe

1974 births
Brier champions
Canadian chiropractors
Curlers from Saskatchewan
Living people
Curlers from Calgary
Sportspeople from Moose Jaw
Canadian male curlers
Canadian curling coaches
Continental Cup of Curling participants
Canada Cup (curling) participants